Chris Gomez (7 May 1899 – 13 March 1947) was an Australian rules footballer who played with North Melbourne and Essendon in the Victorian Football League (VFL).
He first played senior football on the west coast of Tasmania with the Gormanston Football Club, which played in the Lyell Miners Football Association, based in Queenstown.  The large mines in the region supplied sufficient players for 9 teams.

Notes

External links 

1899 births
1947 deaths
Australian rules footballers from Victoria (Australia)
North Melbourne Football Club players
Essendon Football Club players